Giornale di Sicilia is an Italian daily national newspaper for the island of Sicily. It is based in Palermo, and is the best-selling newspaper in Sicily. Since 2017, it is owned by the daily newspaper of Messina, Gazzetta del Sud.

History and profile
Giornale di Sicilia was founded in 1860, immediately following the Expedition of the Thousand headed by Giuseppe Garibaldi; it was first published on 7 June of that year under the name "Giornale Officiale di Sicilia" with Girolamo Ardizzone as its first editor-in-chief.

The paper played a significant role in nationalizing the Italian rural women in Sicily at the beginning of the 1900s.

It is published in ten different local versions, one for each province of Sicily plus another one for the city of Palermo.

Giornale di Sicilia had a circulation of 67,216 copies in 2004. The circulation of the paper was 67,332 copies in 2008.

See also
Gazzetta del Sud
La Sicilia

Notes

External links
  

1860 establishments in Italy
1860 establishments in the Kingdom of the Two Sicilies
Daily newspapers published in Italy
Italian-language newspapers
Mass media in Palermo
Newspapers established in 1860